Tan Suee Chieh is a Malaysian-Singaporean businessman and actuary. He was appointed the Group Chief Executive at NTUC Enterprise on 1 October 2013.

Previously Tan was Chief Executive of NTUC Income Insurance Co-operative Limited in Singapore from February 2007 to September 2013.
He has served as a member of the organisation’s Board of Directors since 2003. Prior to that, he held the position of President, Asia Pacific Region of the SHL Group plc, a British human resource consultancy firm and a world leader in objective assessment and psychometric instruments. From 1981 to 2001, he was with the Prudential plc and held several senior positions including the Company Actuary of Prudential Malaysia, Chief Executive of Prudential Singapore and Managing Director, Established Markets of Prudential Asia.

Tan’s directorships include International Cooperative and Mutual Insurance Federation and Allnations Board.  Tan is also the Co-chairman of the Institute of Service Excellence@SMU, Vice Chairman of the Singapore Children’s Society Executive Committee, a member of the Board of Governors of the Asia Pacific Risk and Insurance Association, Advisory Board Member of the Centre for Strategic Leadership at National University of Singapore and Sim Kee Boon Institute for Financial Economics at Singapore Management University, and Trustee of the Singapore London School of Economics (LSE) Trust.

He is a Fellow of the Royal Statistical Society and Institute of Actuaries, and was a past president of the Life Insurance Association of Singapore as well as the Actuarial Society of Malaysia. Tan has a first class honours degree from the London School of Economics, and a master's degree in Social Organizational Psychology from Columbia University, New York.

In 2013, Tan was the recipient of Singapore Business Award’s Outstanding CEO of the Year, the Ruth Wong Award from the Singapore Children's Society, the Friend of Labour Award from Singapore’s National Trades Union Congress, and the Lifetime Achievement Award conferred by the Institute of Advertising Singapore  in 2012. Tan was also named in the Prestige Singapore List 2013.
Tan is a past president of the Institute and Faculty of Actuaries (IFoA).  He was the IFoA's first Asian president.

Personal life
Tan is the father of two children.

References

Singaporean businesspeople
Singaporean chief executives
Malaysian businesspeople
Alumni of the London School of Economics
Teachers College, Columbia University alumni
Actuaries
Living people
1959 births